Stylocline micropoides is a species of flowering plant in the family Asteraceae known by the common names woollyhead neststraw, woollyhead fanbract and desert neststraw. It is native to the southwestern United States and northern areas in the northern states of Mexico, where it grows in desert habitat and other dry areas. It is a small annual herb growing at ground level with stems up to 20 centimeters in length. It is woolly or felt-like in texture with a coating of white hairs. The pointed leaves are up to 2 centimeters long and alternately arranged. The inflorescence bears spherical flower heads no more than a centimeter in diameter. The head generally has no phyllaries, or has small ones that fall away early. It contains several woolly white flowers.

References

External links

 Calflora Database: Stylocline micropoides (Desert nest straw,  Woollyhead neststraw)
Jepson Manual eFlora (TJM2) treatment of Stylocline micropoides
  USDA Plants Profile for Stylocline micropoides (woollyhead neststraw)
Flora of North America
UC CalPhotos gallery of 'Stylocline micropoides'' 

micropoides
North American desert flora
Flora of the California desert regions
Flora of Baja California
Flora of Chihuahua (state)
Flora of Sonora
Flora of the Southwestern United States
Flora of the South-Central United States
Flora of the Chihuahuan Desert
Flora of the Sonoran Deserts
Natural history of the Mojave Desert
Taxa named by Asa Gray
Flora without expected TNC conservation status